The 2008–09 Old Dominion Monarchs basketball team represented Old Dominion University in National Collegiate Athletic Association (NCAA) Division I men's basketball during the 2008–09 season. Playing in the Colonial Athletic Association (CAA) and led by eighth-year head coach Blaine Taylor, the Monarchs finished the season with a 25–10 overall record and won the 2009 CollegeInsider.com Postseason Tournament – the first year of the tournament's existence.

In CAA play, the Monarchs finished in third place with a 12–6 record. They advanced to the semi-finals of the 2009 CAA tournament, where they lost to eventual champion VCU, 61–53.

Roster

Schedule and Results
Source, 
All times are Eastern

|-
!colspan=9| Exhibition

|-
!colspan=9| Regular Season

|-
!colspan=10| 2009 CAA men's basketball tournament

|-
!colspan=10| 2009 CollegeInsider.com Postseason Tournament

References

Old Dominion Monarchs men's basketball seasons
Old Dominion
CollegeInsider.com Postseason Tournament championship seasons
Old Dominion
Old Dominion Monarchs Basketball Team
Old Dominion Monarchs Basketball Team